Willie Weeks (born 5 August 1986) is a British musician, songwriter, and record producer. One of his songs with Matt Redman reached No. 1 in the U.S. Billboard Top Christian Albums chart in 2013, and he has since worked with and contributed music for BTS, Monsta X, Cravity, Taeyeon, SF9, TVXQ, Mark & Xiumin, Oh My Girl and Newton Faulkner.

Career 

His first achievement came in 2013, writing for Matt Redman's Your Grace Finds Me. Weeks has since been involved in other songs for Redman's albums, including These Christmas Lights, Unbroken Praise and Glory Song. He was also a part of writing "27 Million", a song by Matt Redman and LZ7, who released it with the intention to raise awareness for the A21 Campaign, with the aim to abolish modern day slavery. The song reached No. 12 in the UK official singles chart.

He wrote the Kpop song, "Wishing on a Star" for BTS's Youth album in 2016. Since then, Weeks has written and produced several songs which led UKP magazine to name him the brain behind K-pop.

He wrote the Monsta X songs "Follow: Find You", which reached No. 1 on the Gaon Music Chart, "Fantasia X" and "Love Killa" from the band's Fatal Love album. He also wrote "Extra VIP" for SixTones' 1ST. He has also written for Cravity, Taeyeon, SF9, Mark & Xiumin and Oh My Girl. He has also worked as a songwriter and producer with Newton Faulkner, TVXQ and Kizzy Crawford

References 

1986 births
Living people